Macalla phaeobasalis is a species of snout moth in the genus Macalla. It was described by George Hampson in 1916 and is known from Cuba, Jamaica and Florida.

References

Moths described in 1916
Epipaschiinae